Shanmugavel Rajendran (சண்முகவேல் ராஜேந்திரன்) is an Indian politician and former Member of the Legislative Assembly of Kerala who is also called as sahavu "SR" by his supporters. He was elected to the Kerala Legislative Assembly as a Communist Party of India (Marxist) candidate from Devikulam constituency in 2006 election.
He has won in Devikulam constituency in 2011 and 2016 consequently.

He was also elected as District panchayat president of Idukki in 2003.

References 

http://www.elections.in/kerala/assembly-constituencies/devikulam.html

Living people
1964 births
Communist Party of India (Marxist) politicians from Kerala